Free riding (also known as freeriding or free-riding) is a term used in stock trading to describe the practice of buying and selling shares or other securities without actually having the capital to cover the trade. In a cash account, a free riding violation occurs when the investor sells a stock that was purchased with unsettled funds.

The Federal Reserve Board's Regulation T requires brokers to "freeze" accounts that commit freeriding violations for 90 days. Accounts with this restriction can still trade but cannot purchase stocks with unsettled sale proceeds (stocks take two days to settle). Freeriding can often be avoided by using a margin account.

Trade Day + 2 Days
In the United States, stocks take two business days to settle. If you buy a stock on a Monday, you do not have to pay for the purchase until Wednesday. This is known as trade day plus 2 days, or T+2. This two-day settlement period is considered an extension of credit from the broker to the customer. Because the transaction is considered a credit issue, the Federal Reserve is responsible for the rule, which is officially called Federal Reserve Board Regulation T.

If a brokerage customer is approved for margin trading, there will be a line of credit to "cushion" the two day settlement period, but there is a limit on it. This credit allows customers to trade while the trade settles. A client in good faith agrees to make full payment of settled funds or to deposit securities within the two-day settlement period and to not sell the newly purchased stock before making such payment.

For accounts without margin (aka "cash accounts"), traders who buy stock shares must have or deposit enough cash in the account on the day they are due (T+2) to pay for the purchases. Likewise, if a trader sells shares, the cash may be credited to their account balance immediately but the trade will not settle for two days. Any stock bought with this unsettled cash must be held until the cash is settled, funds are deposited, or margin is increased, to allow settling of the purchase before a sale.

Free Riding Violation
The Securities and Exchange Commission states "In a cash account, you must pay for the purchase of a stock before you can sell it. If you buy and sell a stock before paying for it, you are free riding, which violates the credit extension provisions of the Federal Reserve Board. If you free ride, your broker must freeze your account for 90 days."

If someone is trading rapidly and using all the cash available in the account to buy and sell, that person will likely get a "freeriding violation." Clients can still trade during the 90-day restriction, but they lose the ability to make purchases with unsettled sale proceeds.

Good Faith and Free Riding 
The main difference between a good faith violation and free riding is the eventual deposit of funds to cover the purchase. In free riding, the buyer sells the security without ever depositing the funds to pay for the initial purchase.

The Federal Reserve considers a good faith violation an "abuse of credit" and requires the broker keep track of them. If the trader has four good faith violations in one year, the broker is required to restrict the account. This is compared to a free riding violation which results in an automatic restriction.

Liquidation and Free Riding 
A liquidation violation occurs when the client sells a security to satisfy a cash obligation for the purchase of a different security after the trade date. This is a violation because the sale of the second security will not be settled by the time the first purchase settles. A liquidation violation carries the same penalties as a good faith violation.

SEC enforcement actions 
Apart from credit rule violations inherent in free riding, the more significant and direct harm can come when the customer never pays or deposits to cover the trade, leaving the broker holding the bag (if the trade was a success, the broker nets the trades; however, if it was not, the customer will need to deposit the difference). The Securities and Exchange Commission has brought successful civil injunctive enforcement actions against free riders, with follow-on criminal prosecutions by the U.S. Attorney in New York, where significant prison sentences were imposed, for both credit and antifraud violations where it was clear that the customer never intended to cover the trade and was only using a succession of brokers to play the market, hoping for success, and causing serious losses to brokers. See SEC v. Sholom Teitelbaum, SEC News Digest https://www.sec.gov/news/digest/1981/dig061181.pdf (civil injunctive action, injunction granted) and https://www.sec.gov/news/digest/1981/dig012381.pdf (criminal prosecution, concurrent 18 months sentence).

References

Stock market